Cherith, Kerith, or sometimes Chorath (from the Septuagint's  ), is the name of a wadi, or intermittent seasonal stream mentioned in the Hebrew Bible. The prophet Elijah hid himself on the banks of the Cherith and was fed by ravens during the early part of the three years' drought which he announced to King Ahab.

Etymology and toponymy
Cherith is a common English spelling of the Hebrew name כְּרִית "Kərīṯ", that  comes from the Hebrew root כרת (kh*r*t) meaning to cut off or cut down. The name also signifies to engrave or carve, a cutting, separation, gorge, torrent-bed, or winter-stream.

Chorath is the name used in the 3rd-century BCE Greek translation of the Torah or Pentateuch, known as the Septuagint.

Cherith is referred to as a nahal in Hebrew (נחל), a seasonal stream often described in a MENA context as a wadi, from the Arabic term وادي.

Identification

Wadi al-Yabis
It is usually identified with Wadi al-Yabis, a stream in western Jordan, which flows into the Jordan River at a spot opposite of Beit She'an and slightly south of it. Travellers have described it as one of the wildest ravines of the Fertile Crescent, and peculiarly fitted to afford a secure asylum to the persecuted. During the summer, the stream is very dry. Olive trees grow on its banks, and it is home to an array of wildlife including gazelle, hyrax, and egret.

According to the 1994 Peace treaty between Israel and Jordan, Israel can maintain its use of the Jordan River waters between the Yarmouk and Wadi al-Yabis.

Wadi Kelt
Alternatively, the stream Cherith has been identified by some with Wadi Kelt at St. George's Monastery. If 1 Kings 17:3 is to be translated "Wadi Cherith, which is east of the Jordan", this identification would be in contradiction to the Bible, since Wadi Qelt is west of it. The King James version states Elijah should "turn eastward" (from Samaria); therefore the brook could be anywhere east of Samaria (Now Sebastia, West Bank), on either side of the River Jordan. Some translations (i.e. the Orthodox Jewish Bible) allow such an interpretation, by stating that Cherith is merely "near the Yarden" (Yarden being the Hebrew name of the River Jordan).

Wadi Fusail
Conder and Kitchener noted, while writing of Qaryut, that "[t]his place, being at the head of Wady Fusail, seems to have given rise to the mediaeval identification of that valley as the Brook Cherith (mentioned by Marino Sanuto in 1321)." Sanuto commented that the stream extended into Phasaelis, which was named after Prince Phasael, the brother of King Herod. This identification would again contradict the more common translation of 1 Kings 17:3 (see above: Wadi Kelt), since Wadi Fusail with both modern Qaryut and ancient Phasaelis lie west, not east of the Jordan.

Other uses of the name
The name is also a Mizrahi Jewish surname, specifically among Jews of Yemenite extraction. They descend from the tribe of Bnei Chorath which is of Qahtanite origin and was once one of the most important tribes of the city of Najran.

References

Jewish surnames
Qahtanites
Torah places
Wadis of Israel
Wadis of Jordan
Hebrew Bible rivers
Canyons and gorges
Fluvial landforms
Valleys of Asia